Tres is the third studio album released by the rock en español band Fiel a la Vega. It was released in 1999 by EMI Latin and is the first album by the band released on an international label.

Track listing 
All songs written by Tito Auger and Ricky Laureano, except where noted.
 "Desde el Comienzo" (Jorge Arraiza, Auger, Laureano) – 6:45
 "Indogmatización" – 3:33
 "Este Camino" – 5:29
 "Canción en la Arena" – 6:34
 "Solamente" – 5:23
 "Elipsis de una Fuga" (Auger) – 6:53
 "Quisiera Ser" – 5:51
 "Breve Anécdota de Heroismo Folklórico de Fin del Milenio" (Auger) – 7:46
 "Memorias de la Plaza" – 6:06

Personnel 
 Tito Auger – lead vocals, rhythm guitar
 Ricky Laureano – lead guitar, vocals
 Jorge Arraiza – bass guitar
 Pedro Arraiza – drums, harmonica
 Papo Román – percussion

Additional musicians 
 Luis Marín – piano, Hammond B3
 Carlos Cruz – accordion ("Solamente")
 Rubén Emanuelli – harmonica ("Elipsis de una Fuga")
 Angelo Torres – string arrangement ("Desde el Comienzo")
 Arnaldo Figueroa – violin ("Desde el Comienzo")
 Richard Downes – violin ("Desde el Comienzo")
 Marta Hernández – viola ("Desde el Comienzo")
 José Daniel De Jesús – cello ("Desde el Comienzo")

Recording 
 José Vallejo – executive producer
 Recorded at Digitec, San Juan, Puerto Rico, from September 3 to October 9, 1999, by Gerardo López.
 Assisted by Carlos Cruz and Humberto Soto
 Mastered at Masterdisk, New York City, by Leon Zervos.

1999 albums
Fiel a la Vega albums